Linonghin is a village in the Kogho Department of Ganzourgou Province in central Burkina Faso. The village has a population of 465.

On August 11, 1974, Linonghin was the site of Burkina Faso's deadliest airliner crash. An Ilyushin Il-18V of Air Mali that had diverted to Ouagadougou on a flight to Niamey began circling the wrong town, and made a forced landing after running out of fuel. 47 of the 60 on board were killed.

References

Populated places in the Plateau-Central Region
Ganzourgou Province